Donald Gordon Howse (born July 28, 1952) is a Canadian retired professional ice hockey player who played for the Los Angeles Kings in the National Hockey League (NHL).

Career statistics

External links

1952 births
Living people
Binghamton Dusters players
Canadian ice hockey left wingers
Greensboro Generals (EHL) players
Hershey Bears players
Houston Apollos players
Ice hockey people from Newfoundland and Labrador
Los Angeles Kings players
Nova Scotia Voyageurs players
Ottawa 67's players
People from Grand Falls-Windsor
Undrafted National Hockey League players